Moe Abutoq is a Scottish film director and film producer. His debut started on the Scottish Television series River City where he has directed a number of episodes for BBC Scotland from 2014 onwards. In 2015, he co directed the  feature film Wasted Time with longtime collaborator David Hayman Jr. The film tells the story of a Glaswegian prisoner at Barlinnie Prison who is wrongly accused of a crime he did not commit. The film, featuring Scottish actor David Hayman was shot over a fortnight on a budget of £12,000 and marked the first feature for Shooter Films. Wasted Time had its world premiere at the 2015 edition of the Glasgow Film Festival. In 2017, he was appointed as Director of the revised series of the BBC children's programme Raven.

Filmography

Film

Television

References

External links

Living people
British film directors
Scottish film directors
Year of birth missing (living people)